The major oil terminals / depots in India are:

Agra Terminal of IOCL
 Dhourmui Terminals of IOCL, BPCL and HPCL near Bharatpur,
Roorkee Terminal of IOCL
 Manmad Terminals of IOCL, BPCL and HPCL,
 Irumpanam Terminal of BPCL in Kochi
 Jalandhar Terminals of IOCL, BPCL and HPCL,
 Ambala Terminal of IOCL, BPCL and HPCL,
 Mangaluru terminal of IOCL, BPCL and HPCL
 Sangrur terminal of 
IOCL, BPCL and HPCL,
 Bhatinda terminal of IOCL, BPCL and HPCL,
 Jammu Depot of IOCL,
 Srinagar depot of IOCL, BPCL and HPCL,
 Parwanoo depot of IOCL,
Kandla Foreshore Terminal of IOCL which is the largest POL terminal of IOCL
 Rewari Terminal of IOCL, BPCL and HPCL,
Bijwasan Terminal of IOCL ner Delhi,
 Shakurbasti terminal of IOCL,
 Panipat Marketing Complex of IOCL, BPCL and HPCL,
 Mathura Terminal of IOCL,
 Sanganer Terminal of IOCL near Jaipur

See also

Renewable energy in India

chennai termainal hpcl

Oil terminals
Petroleum infrastructure in India